Duncan Saal (born ) is a South African rugby union player for the  in Super Rugby Unlocked and  in the Currie Cup. His regular position is wing.

Saal was named in the  squad for the Super Rugby Unlocked competition.

References

1996 births
Living people
Cheetahs (rugby union) players
Free State Cheetahs players
Rugby union players from Bellville, South Africa
Rugby union wings
South African rugby union players
Western Province (rugby union) players